Elena Leonidovna Nurgalieva (born 9 January 1976 in Perm Krai) is a Russian ultramarathon runner. She won the Comrades Marathon 8 times and the Two Oceans Marathon 4 times, and with her identical twin Olesya Nurgalieva dominated the Comrades and Two Oceans Marathons, South Africa's main ultramarathons, from 2003 to 2014.

Ultramarathon career 
Nurgalieva is an eight-time winner of the Comrades Marathon.

She has won the 56 km Two Oceans Marathon four times, in 2004, 2005, 2009 and 2012.

References 

1976 births
Living people
People from Perm Krai
Female ultramarathon runners
Russian female long-distance runners
Russian female marathon runners
Twin sportspeople
Russian twins
Russian ultramarathon runners
Sportspeople from Perm Krai
20th-century Russian women
21st-century Russian women